Vladimir Nikolaevich Smirnov (15 April 1947 – 8 May 2014) was a Soviet association football defender.

Club career
He played 75 games for Kuban in 1965–67 and 82 games for FC Dynamo Moscow in 1968-71.

References

1947 births
Sportspeople from Krasnodar
2014 deaths
Soviet footballers
Association football defenders
FC Kuban Krasnodar players
FC Dynamo Moscow players
Soviet Top League players